Le Petit Chose (1868), translated into English as Little Good-For-Nothing (1878, Mary Neal Sherwood) and Little What's-His-Name (1898, Jane Minot Sedgwick), is an autobiographical memoir by French author Alphonse Daudet.

Contents
Taking its title from the author's nickname, it recounts Daudet's early years from childhood, through boarding school and finally to Paris and his first successes as an author. It was Daudet's first published, though not first written, work.

Influence
Canadian author Yann Martel (Life of Pi), in talking about his most memorable childhood book, recalled Le Petit Chose, saying that he read it when he was ten years old, and that it was the first time he found a book so heartbreaking that it moved him to tears.

Film
In 1938 the book was made into a movie of the same name by the French director Maurice Cloche. It starred Arletty, Marianne Oswald, and Marcelle Barry in the leading roles and featured then 14-year-old classical guitarist Ida Presti in a supporting role as a guitar player.

Notes

External links
Le Petit Chose at Internet Archive (collection includes English translations).
Chapter IV: "History of my Books, Little What's-His-Name", from Thirty Years in Paris, by Alphonse Daudet. 
  Le Petit Chose, audio version 

1868 non-fiction books
Autobiographies adapted into films
Works by Alphonse Daudet